William Stanley Merwin (September 30, 1927 – March 15, 2019) was an American poet who wrote more than fifty books of poetry and prose, and produced many works in translation. During the 1960s anti-war movement, Merwin's unique craft was thematically characterized by indirect, unpunctuated narration. In the 1980s and 1990s, his writing influence derived from an interest in Buddhist philosophy and deep ecology. Residing in a rural part of Maui, Hawaii, he wrote prolifically and was dedicated to the restoration of the island's rainforests.

Merwin received many honors, including the Pulitzer Prize for Poetry in 1971 and 2009; the National Book Award for Poetry in 2005, and the Tanning Prize—one of the highest honors bestowed by the Academy of American Poets—as well as the Golden Wreath of the Struga Poetry Evenings. In 2010, the Library of Congress named him the 17th United States Poet Laureate. the National Book Award for Poetry in 2005, and the Tanning Prize—one of the highest honors bestowed by the Academy of American Poets—as well as the Golden Wreath of the Struga Poetry Evenings. In 2010, the Library of Congress named him the 17th United States Poet Laureate.

Early life 

W. S. Merwin was born in New York City on September 30, 1927. He grew up on the corner of Fourth Street and New York Avenue in Union City, New Jersey, and lived there until 1936, when his family moved to Scranton, Pennsylvania. As a child, Merwin was enamored of the natural world, sometimes finding himself talking to the large tree in his back yard. He was also fascinated with things that he saw as links to the past, such as the building behind his home that had once been a barn which housed a horse and carriage. At the age of five he started writing hymns for his father, a Presbyterian minister.

Career

Early career: 1952–1976 
After attending Princeton University in 1952, Merwin married Dorothy Jeanne Ferry, and moved to Spain. During his stay there, while visiting the renowned poet Robert Graves at his homestead on the island of Majorca, he served as tutor to Graves's son. There, he met Dido Milroy, fifteen years his senior, with whom he collaborated on a play and whom he later married and lived with in London. In 1956, Merwin moved to Boston for a fellowship at the Poets' Theater. He returned to London, where he befriended Sylvia Plath and Ted Hughes. In 1968, Merwin moved to New York City, separating from his wife Dido Milroy, who stayed at their home in France. In the late 1970s, Merwin moved to Hawaii and eventually was divorced from Dido Milroy. He married Paula Dunaway in 1983.

From 1956 to 1957, Merwin was also playwright-in-residence at the Poet's Theatre in Cambridge, Massachusetts; he became poetry editor at The Nation in 1962. Besides being a prolific poet, he was a respected translator of Spanish, French, Latin and Italian literature and poetry (including Lazarillo de Tormes and Dante's Purgatorio) as well as poetry from Sanskrit, Yiddish, Middle English, Japanese and Quechua. He served as selector of poems of the American poet Craig Arnold (1967–2009).

Merwin is known for his poetry about the Vietnam War, and can be included among the canon of Vietnam War-era poets which includes writers Robert Bly, Robert Duncan, Adrienne Rich, Denise Levertov, Robert Lowell, Allen Ginsberg and Yusef Komunyakaa.

Merwin's early subjects were frequently tied to mythological or legendary themes, while many of his poems featured animals. A volume called The Drunk in the Furnace (1960) marked a change for Merwin, in that he began to write in a more autobiographical way.

In the 1960s, Merwin lived in a small apartment in New York City's Greenwich Village.

Later career: 1977–2019 

Merwin's volume Migration: New and Selected Poems won the 2005 National Book Award for poetry.

In 1998, Merwin wrote Folding Cliffs:  A Narrative, an ambitious novel-in-verse about Hawaiʻi in history and legend.

The Shadow of Sirius, published in 2008 by Copper Canyon Press, was awarded the 2009 Pulitzer Prize for poetry.

In June 2010, the Library of Congress named Merwin the seventeenth United States Poet Laureate, to replace the outgoing Kay Ryan. He is the subject of the 2014 documentary film Even Though the Whole World Is Burning. Merwin appeared in the PBS documentary The Buddha, released in 2010. He had moved to Hawaii to study with the Zen Buddhist master Robert Aitken in 1976.

In 2010, with his wife Paula, he co-founded The Merwin Conservancy, a nonprofit organization dedicated to preserving his hand-built, off-the-grid poet's home and 18-acre restored property in Haiku, Maui, which has been transformed from an "agricultural wasteland" to a "Noah's Ark" for rare palm trees, one of the largest and most biodiverse collections of palms in the world.

Merwin's last book of poetry, Garden Time (Copper Canyon Press, 2016), was composed during the difficult process of losing his eyesight. When he could no longer see well enough to write, he dictated poems to his wife, Paula. It is a book about aging and the practice of living one's life in the present. Writing about Garden Time in The New York Times, Jeff Gordinier suggests that "Merwin's work feels like part of some timeless continuum, a river that stretches all the way back to Han Shan and Li Po."

In 2017, Copper Canyon Press published The Essential W. S. Merwin, a book which traces the seven decade legacy of Merwin's poetry, with selections ranging from his 1952 debut, A Mask for Janus, to 2016's Garden Time, as well as a selection of translations and lesser known prose narratives. Merwin's literary papers are held at the Rare Book & Manuscript Library at the University of Illinois at Urbana–Champaign. The collection consists of some 5,500 archival items, and 450 printed books.

Death 
Merwin lived on land that was part of a pineapple plantation, on the northeast coast of Maui, Hawaii.

W.S Merwin died on March 15, 2019, in his sleep at his home, as reported by his publisher Copper Canyon Press.

Awards 
1952: Yale Younger Poets Prize for A Mask for Janus
 1954: Kenyon Review Fellowship in Poetry
 1956: Rockefeller Fellowship
 1957: National Institute of Arts and Letters grant
 1957: Playwrighting Bursary, Arts Council of Great Britain
 1961: Rabinowitz Foundation Grant
 1962: Bess Hokin Prize, Poetry magazine
 1964/1965: Ford Foundation Grant
 1966: Chapelbrook Foundation Fellowship
 1967: Harriet Monroe Memorial Prize, Poetry magazine
 1969: PEN Translation Prize for Selected Translations 1948–1968
 1969: Rockefeller Foundation Grant
 1971: Pulitzer Prize for Poetry for The Carrier of Ladders (published in 1971)
 1973: Academy of American Poets Fellowship
 1974: Shelley Memorial Award
 1979: Bollingen Prize for Poetry, Yale University Library
 1987: Governor's Award for Literature of the state of Hawaii
 1990: Maurice English Poetry Award
 1993: The Tanning Prize for mastery in the art of poetry
 1993: Lenore Marshall Poetry Prize for Travels
 1994: Lila Wallace-Reader's Digest Writers' Award
 1999: Poetry Consultant to the Library of Congress,  a jointly-held position with Rita Dove and Louise Glück
 2005: National Book Award for Poetry for Migration: New and Selected Poems
 2004: Golden Wreath Award of the Struga Poetry Evenings Festival in Macedonia
 2004: Lannan Lifetime Achievement Award
 2008: Golden Plate Award, American Academy of Achievement
 2009: Pulitzer Prize for Poetry for The Shadow of Sirius (published in 2008)
2010: Kenyon Review Award for Literary Achievement
2010: United States Poet Laureate
2013: Zbigniew Herbert International Literary Award

Other accolades 
Merwin's home town honored him in 2006 by renaming a local street near his childhood home W. S. Merwin Way.

Bibliography

Other sources 

The Union City Reporter March 12, 2006.

References

Further reading 
 Armenti, Peter. W. S. Merwin: Online Resources, Library of Congress, accessed November 25, 2010.
 W. S. Merwin at the Steven Barclay Agency, accessed November 25, 2010.
 Norton, Ingrid. "Second Glance: Today belongs to few and tomorrow to no one"  Open Letters Monthly, accessed November 25, 2010.
 
 Kubota, Gary T. "Catching Up With Maui's Most Famous Poet: At Home and at Peace In a Tropical Landscape, W. S. Merwin Enriches the Literature of Nature" , Honolulu Star-Bulletin, April 21, 2001
W. S. Merwin – Online Poems, Modern American Poetry, University of Illinois at Urbana–Champaign, accessed November 25, 2010.
 Lerner, Ben. "The Emptiness at the End"  Jacket magazine, October 2005

External links 

 The Merwin Conservancy

 W. S. Merwin at Poets.org
 Profile and poems of W. S. Merwin, including audio files, at the Poetry Foundation
 "Two Pulitzer Prizes for Poetry". Academy of Achievement, July 3, 2008
 W.S. Merwin: To Plant a Tree PBS
Stuart A. Rose Manuscript, Archives, and Rare Book Library, Emory University: Letters to W.S. (William Stanley) and Dido Merwin, 1958–1969

1927 births
2019 deaths
American pacifists
American Poets Laureate
American Presbyterians
Members of the American Academy of Arts and Letters
National Book Award winners
The New Yorker people
People from Union City, New Jersey
Writers from Scranton, Pennsylvania
Princeton University alumni
Pulitzer Prize for Poetry winners
Struga Poetry Evenings Golden Wreath laureates
Translators of Dante Alighieri
Translators to English
Poets from Hawaii
Poets from New Jersey
Writers from New York City
Bollingen Prize recipients
American male poets
Yale Younger Poets winners
Wyoming Seminary alumni